For Sentimental Reasons may refer to:

 For Sentimental Reasons (Nat King Cole album), 1997
 For Sentimental Reasons (Ella Fitzgerald album), 1955
 For Sentimental Reasons (Linda Ronstadt album), 1986
 For Sentimental Reasons, a 2007 album by Bobby Hutcherson
 "For Sentimental Reasons" (1936 song), a song popularized in the 1930s by Tommy Dorsey
 "(I Love You) For Sentimental Reasons", a song written by William "Pat" Best